"Bed of Lies" is a song by Trinidadian-American rapper and singer Nicki Minaj, taken from her third studio album, The Pinkprint (2014). The song was first premiered at the 2014 MTV EMAs in Glasgow, Scotland and was later released on November 16, 2014, by Young Money Entertainment, Cash Money Records and Republic Records as the fourth single from the album. The track features American singer-songwriter Skylar Grey on the chorus plus additional vocals on the verses as well as piano playing and was written by the latter along with Minaj. "Bed of Lies" features a restrained keyboard and lyrics that touch upon themes of "heartfelt litany of grievances" about an ex-lover.

The song peaked at number 62 on the US Billboard Hot 100 and became Minaj's 56th Hot 100 entry, tying her with Madonna and Dionne Warwick for the third-most entries among women. It peaked at number seven in Australia and number 13 in New Zealand. "Bed of Lies" was certified platinum by the Australian Recording Industry Association and gold by Recorded Music NZ.

Background
Minaj debuted the song at the 2014 MTV EMAs in Glasgow, Scotland with Skylar Grey. In an interview with Billboard, Grey revealed that she had written and recorded a demo version of the track before it had been sent to Minaj who wrote and recorded verses of her own to the song. Grey commented, "She liked the demo of it enough to keep me on the song. I knew it was maybe gonna happen, but she released a lot of different singles first. So I didn’t really know when she was gonna drop this song. And then about a week ago I got a call from her team and they wondered if I could come to Scotland and do the song with them." On November 15, the full song premiered on Saturday Night Online; it was made available on iTunes the next day.

Composition 
"Bed of Lies" is a hip hop and pop song, written in the key of B major with a moderate tempo of 86 beats per minute.  The vocals in the song span from G3 to B4, and the song follows a chord progression of B – F/A – Gm – F/A – B.

Critical reception

Deniqua Campbell from The Source gave the song a positive review, saying Minaj has yet to let up her unrelenting push to re-ignite her rapping flame and that "Bed of Lies" "appeals to Minaj's more serene nature". Caitlin White from MTV News praised the song, saying "Nicki has always done emotional with just the right touch of vulnerability and strength". Christina Lee from Idolator called it "a more pointed and detailed version of debut Pinkprint single 'Pills n Potions'". Lindsey Weber from Vulture said "Nicki takes a sickly sweet Skylar Grey hook and wraps a nasty ode around it". Sharan Shetty from Slate called "Bed of Lies" "perhaps the most confessional song Minaj has ever made" and praised the fact that Minaj didn't come off as having a "pity party". Eliza Thompson from Cosmopolitan praised the song and said Grey's hook was "all pretty and wistful".

Commercial performance
"Bed of Lies" debuted at number seventy on the US Billboard Hot 100, in doing so it became Minaj's 56th entry on the chart, tying her with Madonna and Dionne Warwick for the third-most entries among women since the chart began in 1958. On January 16, 2015, ARIA certified the single Platinum in Australia for sales of 70,000.

Live performances
On November 9, 2014, Minaj and Grey debuted the song performing at the 2014 MTV EMA. They also performed the song on November 23, 2014, at the 2014 AMAs and on December 6, 2014, on Saturday Night Live.
 On December 15, 2014, they performed the track at The Ellen DeGeneres Show. On December 16, 2014, they performed the song twice, first on Today and after on The Tonight Show Starring Jimmy Fallon.

Charts

Weekly

Year-end

Certifications

Radio and release history

References

2010s ballads
2014 songs
2014 singles
Nicki Minaj songs
Cash Money Records singles
Songs written by Skylar Grey
Skylar Grey songs
Songs written by Nicki Minaj
Republic Records singles
Song recordings produced by Kane Beatz
Song recordings produced by Alex da Kid
Pop ballads
Songs written by Breyan Isaac
Songs written by Kane Beatz
Songs written by Vinay Vyas
Songs written by Justin Davey